The 1996 GP Ouest-France was the 60th edition of the GP Ouest-France cycle race and was held on 1 September 1996. The race started and finished in Plouay. The race was won by Frank Vandenbroucke of the Mapei team.

General classification

References

1996
1996 in road cycling
1996 in French sport